Del Mar (Spanish for "Of the Sea") is a beach town in San Diego County, California, located on the coast of the Pacific Ocean. Established in 1885 as a seaside resort, the city incorporated in 1959. The Del Mar Horse Races are hosted on the Del Mar racetrack every summer.

In 1885, Colonel Jacob Taylor purchased  from Enoch Talbert, with visions of building a seaside resort for the rich and famous.  The United States Navy operated a Naval Auxiliary Air Facility for blimps at Del Mar during World War II. The population was 3,954 at the 2020 census, down from 4,161 at the 2010 census.

The town has a wealthy population along the coast and the bluffs above the ocean. These properties are very vulnerable to climate change, which has caused sea level rise and subsequent coastal erosion. The transportation infrastructure is under threat. The city has a climate change adaptation plan which notably excludes the option of a managed retreat, although the strategy was recommended by the California Coastal Commission in 2019.

History

Del Mar was first settled in the early 1880s by Theodore M. Loop, a railroad official, and his wife Ella. Ella gave the site its name, inspired by Bayard Taylor's poem "The Fight of Paso del Mar". In 1885, Del Mar was officially founded after another settler, "Colonel" Jacob Taylor, purchased the land from homesteader Enoch Talbert.

In 2023, the city was out of compliance with the state Housing Element Law. They submitted a housing plan to the state that did not  meet guidelines for future housing. They were working with the state to get in compliance, but until they did, they couldn't block new housing projects based on city zoning laws alone.

Geography

Del Mar is one of only two locations where the Torrey pine tree naturally occurs. The Torrey pine is the rarest pine in the United States; only two populations of this endangered species exist, in Del Mar and on Santa Rosa Island. The Soledad Valley at the south of Del Mar severs two colony segments.

At the southern edge of Del Mar is the Los Peñasquitos Lagoon. To the north is the San Dieguito Lagoon and the San Dieguito River, which empties into the Pacific Ocean at  Del Mar. The bluffs along Del Mar's south beach are subject to collapse.

Climate
Del Mar's climate is considered mediterranean-subtropical with warm, dry summers and mild, humid winters. Temperatures exceed  only on a few occasions throughout the year and rarely drop below .

Demographics

2010
The 2010 United States Census reported that Del Mar had a population of 4,161. The population density was 2,341.9 people per square mile (904.2 per km2). The racial makeup of Del Mar was 3,912 (94.0%) White, 10 (0.2%) African American, eight (0.2%) Native American, 118 (2.8%) Asian, three (0.1%) Pacific Islander, 25 (0.6%) from other races, and 85 (2.0%) from two or more races.  Hispanic or Latino of any race were 175 people (4.2%).

There were 2,064 households, with 340 (16.5%) having children under the age of 18, and 927 (44.9%) with opposite-sex married couples living together, 114 (5.5%) had a female householder with no husband present, 57 (2.8%) had a male householder with no wife present.  There were 124 (6.0%) unmarried opposite-sex partnerships, and 19 (0.9%) same-sex married couples or partnerships. There were 707 households (34.3%) comprising one individual, and 209 (10.1%) comprising one individual 65 years of age or older. The average household size was 2.02.  There were 1,098 families (53.2% of all households); the average family size was 2.57.

The population comprised 564 people (13.6%) under the age of 18, 205 people (4.9%) aged 18 to 24, 1,071 people (25.7%) aged 25 to 44, 1,455 people (35.0%) aged 45 to 64, and 866 people (20.8%) who were 65 years of age or older.  The median age was 48.6 years. For every 100 females, there were 102.1 males.  For every 100 females age 18 and over, there were 101.1 males.

There were 2,596 housing units at an average density of 1,461.1 per square mile (564.1 per km2), of which 1,113 (53.9%) were owner-occupied, and 951 (46.1%) were occupied by renters. The homeowner vacancy rate was 2.6%; the rental vacancy rate was 7.9%.  Of the population, 2,398 people (57.6% of the population) lived in owner-occupied housing units and 1,763 people (42.4%) lived in rental housing units.

2000

The 2000 census, reported 4,389 people, 2,178 households, and 1,083 families residing in the city, with an average family size of 2.61. The age distribution was reported as 13.6% under the age of 18, 5.4% from 18 to 24, 33.1% from 25 to 44, 33.8% from 45 to 64, and 14.1% who were 65 years of age or older.  The median age was 44 years. For every 100 females, there were 105.0 males.  For every 100 females age 18 and over, there were 105.0 males. The median income for a household in the city was $120,001, and the median income for a family was $130,270. Males had a median income of $81,250 versus $70,069 for females. The per capita income for the city was $92,425.  About 7.8% of families and 8.7% of the population were below the poverty line, including 18.6% of those under age 18 and 8.5% of those age 65 or over.

Current estimates 
According to the San Diego Association of Governments, the estimated population of Del Mar as of January 1, 2018, was 4,322, with 2.08 persons per household and a median household income of $129,880 (not adjusted for inflation).  When adjusted for inflation (2010 dollars; comparable to Census data above), the median household income was $115,179.

Government
The City of Del Mar is governed by a city council of five elected representatives.  Each year a new mayor is chosen from among the councilmembers. In 2022, councilmember and deputy mayor Dwight Worden succeeded councilmember and UCSD Professor Terry Gaasterland as mayor. Worden had previously served as mayor from 2017-2018.

Education
Del Mar is served by the Del Mar Union School District, which includes eight K–8 schools. High school education is provided by the San Dieguito Union High School District.

Transportation
The North County Transit District operates their BREEZE bus service. The historic Del Mar station once served passengers on the Atchison, Topeka and Santa Fe Railway Surf Line and the Amtrak San Diegan intercity service between the early 1900s until its closure in 1995, due to the opening of the new Solana Beach station two miles north. That station provides Coaster commuter rail and Amtrak's Pacific Surfliner service. This trainline is the second busiest passenger rail corridor in the United States.

Environmental issues

Climate change 
Much of the population is on the coast and nearby bluff which are vulnerable to sea level rise caused by climate change. In 2019, the city refused to develop a managed retreat strategy for moving infrastructure and population centers from the water. This decision was made against the recommendation of the California Coastal Commission. Instead the city is planning on using other climate change adaptation strategies, such as seawalls and beach nourishment.

San Diego Association of Governments (SANDAG) is conducting a $3 million study on relocating the rail line farther inland through the city. On August 16, 2020, the California Coastal Commission emphasized the need to move the railroad tracks inland due to the persistent coastal erosion which eats away at the bluff each year. The accelerating rate of sea level rise due to global warming adds urgency to the issue. A tunnel under Del Mar which would cost more than $3 billion is being considered.

Attractions

 Del Mar racetrack, held live during the summer and now the fall at the Del Mar Fairgrounds. The fairgrounds also hosts the satellite wagering facility Surfside Race Place throughout the year when races are not live.
 San Diego County Fair
 Torrey Pines State Beach
 Powerhouse Community Center
 Del Mar Antique Show, held three times a year for over 50 years on the Del Mar Fairgrounds
North Beach Area  (29th Street to Solana Beach border), also known as "Dog Beach".

Notable people
 Desi Arnaz maintained a residence in North Del Mar on the beach west of Highway 101 near the Del Mar Racetrack after his divorce from Lucille Ball. He was arrested once for brandishing a firearm and ordering people off of his beach area. He resided there until his death.
 Burt Bacharach, songwriter, had a beach residence in north Del Mar.
 Gary Beck radio DJ lived on top of Del Mar Heights in the early 70's on Mission Carmel Cove.
 Drew Brees, quarterback of the New Orleans Saints.
 Rachel Buehler, defender for the United States women's national soccer team.
 Martin Cooper, conceived the first handheld mobile phone.
 Tom DeLonge, guitarist and founding member of the pop-punk band Blink-182, rock band Angels & Airwaves, and punk rock band Box Car Racer.
 Jimmy Durante, lived on the beach for many years and has a street named after him.
 Steve Fisher, former head basketball coach at San Diego State University, resident since 1999.
 Rachael Flatt, former figure skater, 2010 Olympian, 2010 US Champion, three-time US silver medalist and 2008 World Junior Champion, was born in Del Mar.
 Terry Gaasterland, professor of biology at UCSD, serves on the Del Mar City Council and served as its mayor.
 Bill Gates, co-founder of Microsoft Corporation, has a vacation residence on Del Mar beach.
 Craig Taro Gold, author, entrepreneur and entertainer, was raised in Del Mar and attended Torrey Pines High School. 
 Tony Hawk, skateboarder and business entrepreneur, was raised in Del Mar.
 Kristin Hayter, singer-songwriter
 Gary E. Jacobs, businessman, philanthropist, minority owner in the Sacramento Kings, founder of the Gary and Jerri-Ann Jacobs High Tech High Charter School, and owner of the Lake Elsinore Storm, lives in Del Mar.
 Sara Jacobs, US Congresswoman
 Nate Kaeding, former San Diego Chargers placekicker.
Charles David Keeling, American scientist known for the Keeling Curve, and Chairman of the Citizen Task Force responsible for developing the City of Del Mar's Community Plan (General Plan) adopted in 1976.
 George R. Lunn, former US Congressman and Lt. Governor of New York.
 William Murray, American fiction editor and staff writer at The New Yorker for more than thirty years and author of numerous fiction and nonfiction work, including a series of mystery novels with a racetrack setting, spent the majority of his later years living in Del Mar.
 George Emil Palade, Nobel Prize winner.
 Carson Palmer, former NFL quarterback.
 Ardem Patapoutian, 2021 Nobel Prize laureate, lives in Del Mar.
 Steve Perry, former lead singer of the rock band Journey, lives in Del Mar.
 Madeleine A. Pickens, along with her deceased husband Allen Paulson owned a home in Del Mar overlooking the Del Mar Racetrack.  She currently owns a home on the beach in Del Mar.
 Tristan Prettyman, singer-songwriter.
 Zandra Rhodes, celebrity fashion designer, splits her time between homes in Del Mar and London.
 Aaron Rodgers, quarterback for the Green Bay Packers.
 Willie Shoemaker, jockey, lived in North Del Mar on beach west of US 101 near Del Mar Racetrack.
Garrett Stubbs, baseball player.
 Norv Turner, former head coach of the San Diego Chargers.

In popular culture
 In 1966, winners of a KHJ radio station contest rode with members of The Monkees band on a train from Del Mar, which had been renamed 'Clarksville' for the day by the town's mayor.
 Del Mar is the first surfing location mentioned in the 1963 Beach Boys song "Surfin' U.S.A."
 Tip on a Dead Crab (Viking Press 1984), William Murray's first mystery in the Shifty Lou Anderson series, is set at Del Mar's racetrack.

References

External links

 
 Del Mar Historical Society

 
Cities in San Diego County, California
Populated coastal places in California
Incorporated cities and towns in California
Populated places established in 1959
1959 establishments in California